Sertum laetitiae (November 1, 1939) is an encyclical from Pope Pius XII to the Catholic Church of the United States of America in memory of the 150th anniversary of the installation of the first American bishop.

The encyclical recalls Pope Pius VI, who appointed bishop John Carroll (bishop) of Baltimore in 1789. It took the help of George Washington, a friend of Carroll, to formalize the erection of the first bishopric of the Catholic Church in the 13 colonies forming the United States. One hundred years later, in 1889, Pope Leo XIII in his encyclical Longinqua Oceani addressed the Church in the United States and issued praise and admonitions.

By 1939, the Church in the United States had nineteen provinces, 115 dioceses, 200 seminaries and numerous institutions. Pius XII, who recalls his official visit three years earlier, expresses his pride in these efforts. He praises the Catholic University of America in Washington D.C. (which away back had offered him a professorship in 1903). The Pontiff supports the wishes of the American bishops to establish an American College in Rome.

The encyclical advises Catholic bishops to be active in advancing racial justice by improving the access of Negroes to Catholic schools. It also critiques blind materialism. It asserts that individual happiness can only be achieved by obeying the Commandments of God, saying that non-observance undermines the basis of true civilization.

Quotations from the encyclical 
 This ruinous and critical state of affairs was put right by the celebrated George Washington, famed for his courage and keen intelligence. He was a close friend of the Bishop of Baltimore. Thus the Father of His Country and the pioneer pastor of the Church in that land so dear to Us, bound together by the ties of friendship.  Holding, so to speak, each the other's hand, they form a picture for their descendants, a lesson to all future generations, and a proof that reverence for the Faith of Christ is a holy and established principle of the American people, seeing that it is the foundation of morality and decency, consequently the source of prosperity and progress 
 The more important of (your) institutions We were able to view briefly during the month of October, 1936, when We journeyed across the ocean and had the joy of knowing personally you and the field of your activities. The memory of what We then admired with Our own eyes will always remain indelible and a source of joy in Our heart.
 Not with the conquest of material space does one approach to God, separation from Whom is death, conversion to Whom is life, to be established in Whom is glory; but under the guidance of Christ with the fullness of sincere faith, with unsullied conscience and upright will, with holy works, with the achievement and the employment of that genuine liberty whose sacred rules are found proclaimed in the Gospel. If, instead, the Commandments of God are spurned, not only is it impossible to attain that happiness which has place beyond the brief span of time which is allotted to earthly existence, but the very basis upon which rests true civilization is shaken and naught is to be expected but ruins over which belated tears must be shed.
 We confess that We feel a special paternal affection, which is certainly inspired of Heaven, for the Negro people dwelling among you; for in the field of religion and education We know that they need special care and comfort and are very deserving of it. We therefore invoke an abundance of heavenly blessing and We pray fruitful success for those whose generous zeal is devoted to their welfare.

See also
List of encyclicals of Pope Pius XII

References

Encyclicals of Pope Pius XII
History of Catholicism in the United States
November 1939 events
1939 documents
1939 in Christianity